Roberto Bracco (1861–1943) was an Italian playwright, screenwriter and journalist. A number of his plays were turned into films, and he worked on the scripts of several of them including the 1914 silent Lost in the Dark. He was nominated for the Nobel Prize in Literature six times.

Also among his works is Un Perfetto Amore, a dramatic dialogue in three acts.

Selected filmography
 Lost in the Dark (1914)

References

Bibliography 
 Goble, Alan. The Complete Index to Literary Sources in Film. Walter de Gruyter, 1999.

External links 
 
 
 

1861 births
1943 deaths
20th-century Italian screenwriters
Film people from Naples
Italian dramatists and playwrights
Italian male screenwriters
Journalists from Naples
Italian Aventinian secessionists
20th-century Italian male writers